

2013–present

1994–2006

References

PlayStation (console)
Technological comparisons